Uzi Narkiss (January 6, 1925 – December 17, 1997) was an Israeli general. Narkiss was commander of the Israel Defense Forces (IDF) units in the Central Region during the 1967 Six-Day War. Narkiss appears in the famous photograph of  Defense Minister Moshe Dayan flanked by Chief of Staff Yitzhak Rabin taken in the Old City of Jerusalem shortly after its capture from Jordanian forces.

Early life
Uzi Narkiss was born in Jerusalem to Polish Jewish parents. His first memory was of going into hiding during the 1929 Arab riots. Narkiss attended high school at Gymnasia Rehavia. He joined the Palmach at the age of 16 and was involved in Haganah operations against British Mandatory forces in Palestine.

Military career

In April 1948, Narkiss headed the assault on Katamon with the Fourth Battalion of the Harel Brigade, during which time they captured the monastery at San Simon — a key strategic position. Following the final departure of the British in May 1948 and the Israeli Declaration of Independence, Narkiss was appointed to assist those besieged in the Jewish Quarter of the Old City. Narkiss' unit, dubbed a "diversionary force," succeeded in penetrating Zion Gate, bringing in supplies and evacuating the wounded from those under siege. When military reinforcements failed to appear, however, Narkiss ordered his men to retreat, with the Old City falling to Jordanian forces shortly thereafter.

Narkiss spent several years studying in France at the École de Guerre (the French Military Academy). He later served as an Israeli military attaché and was awarded the Légion d’honneur by the French government. In 1965, he was appointed the first director of the Israel National Defense College.

During the Six-Day War on June 5, 1967, with seven brigades under his command known as Central Command, Narkiss was responsible for combating any possible Jordanian offensive. Capturing the Old City was not part of the plan. Israel Defense Forces (IDF) units moved effectively to take key positions in east Jerusalem, where one key location was Ammunition Hill. Still, to Narkiss' dismay, the politicians would still not allow the Old City to be taken. But with a looming cease fire approaching after an emergency meeting of the UN, Moshe Dayan gave the order to Narkiss who quickly capitalised on the opportunity to capture the city before any cease fire prevented this as an option. Under his direction, the Old City was captured on June 7 and Jerusalem was reunified under Israeli control. From Narkiss' viewpoint, this completed the campaign he had begun 19 years earlier, and whose previous failure had haunted him.

After the war, the Palestinian village of Beit Awwa was completely destroyed. Moshe Dayan claimed the destruction was carried out under the orders of an officer who wished to expel the residents; Brigadier General  Uzi Narkiss claimed the credit for the action.

Later activities

In response to ongoing fedayeen attacks across the Jordan River in early 1968, the IDF performed dual military operations in March: Operation Asuta, as part of Southern Command operations; and Operation Inferno, as part Narkiss's Central Command. While the IDF considered the former an operational success, the latter resulted in the Battle of Karameh, which obtained mixed results. While Operation Inferno achieved most of its objectives, namely uprooting Fatah from their headquarters at Karameh in Jordan, it failed to capture Yasser Arafat. Moreover, the Israelis suffered numerous casualties and loss of equipment, some of which was paraded through Amman. This emboldened King Hussein, and led to a recruitment wave in Fatah. As a result, Narkiss was quietly relieved of his command, and instead went on to hold key positions in the Jewish Agency and the World Zionist Organization.

In 1948, Uzi Narkiss searched the body of the dead Palestinian commander Abdul Kader Husseini for his Koran on the battlefield. In the 1980s he wanted to give it to Kader's son Faisal Husseini but only "in the presence of journalists and TV cameras – otherwise I am not interested". Husseini was not interested under such terms, therefore Narkiss kept it in his library.

Death
Narkiss died in 1997 after a long illness at the age of 72. He was buried in the military cemetery on Mount Herzl.

References

External links
 General Uzi Narkiss  – A historic radio interview with General Uzi Narkiss on June 7 – one day after the Six-Day War, describing the battle for Jerusalem
 Central Zionist Archives in Jerusalem site. Office of Uzi Narkiss (S91)

People from Jerusalem
Israeli generals
Israeli people of Polish-Jewish descent
Palmach members
1925 births
1997 deaths
Burials at Mount Herzl